The opal chimaera (Chimaera opalescens) is a chimaera species in the family Chimaeridae, which lives in the northeastern Atlantic Ocean.

References

Chimaera
Fish of the Atlantic Ocean